

Events

January–March 
 January 2
 The Standard Oil Trust is secretly created in the United States to control multiple corporations set up by John D. Rockefeller and his associates. 
 Irish-born author Oscar Wilde arrives in the United States for an extended lecture tour; when asked by a customs official if he has anything to declare, he replies "I have nothing to declare but my genius" according to later tradition.
 January 5 – Charles J. Guiteau is found guilty of the assassination of James A. Garfield (President of the United States) and sentenced to death, despite an insanity defense raised by his lawyer.
 January 12 – Holborn Viaduct power station in the City of London, the world's first coal-fired public electricity generating station, begins operation.
 February 3 – American showman P. T. Barnum acquires the elephant Jumbo from the London Zoo.
 March 2 – Roderick Maclean fails in an attempt to assassinate Queen Victoria, at Windsor.
 March 18 (March 6 Old Style) – The Principality of Serbia becomes the Kingdom of Serbia following a proclamation.
 March 20 – British gunboats enter Monrovia, with Arthur Havelock demanding that Liberia cede disputed territory to the British colony of Sierra Leone, of which he is Governor.
 March 22 – Polygamy is made a felony by the Edmunds Act, passed by the United States Congress.
 March 24 – Robert Koch announces the discovery of the bacterium responsible for tuberculosis (Mycobacterium tuberculosis).
 March 28
 Republican Jules Ferry makes primary education in France free, non-clerical (laique) and obligatory.
 German medical products company Beiersdorf is founded.
 March 29 – The Knights of Columbus, a Catholic fraternal service organization, is founded in New Haven, Connecticut.

April–June 
 April 3 – Old West outlaw Jesse James is shot in the back of the head and killed by Robert Ford in St. Joseph, Missouri.
 April 29 – The Elektromote, the world's first trolleybus, begins operation in Berlin.
 May – Burnley F.C. in the north of England changes codes, from Rugby union to Association football.
 May 1
 The Berlin Philharmonic orchestra is founded in Germany, as Frühere Bilsesche Kapelle.
 Édouard Manet exhibits his painting A Bar at the Folies-Bergère at the Paris Salon.
 May 2 – The Kilmainham Treaty, an agreement between the British government and Irish nationalist leader Charles Stewart Parnell to abate tenant rent arrears, is announced; Parnell is released from Kilmainham Gaol in Dublin.
 May 6 – Phoenix Park Murders in Ireland: Lord Frederick Cavendish, the newly appointed Chief Secretary for Ireland, and Thomas Henry Burke, his Permanent Undersecretary, are fatally stabbed in Phoenix Park, Dublin, by members of the Irish National Invincibles (militant Irish republicans).
 May 8 – The Chinese Exclusion Act is the first important law which restricts immigration into the United States.
 May 20 – The Triple Alliance is formed between Germany, Austria-Hungary and Italy.
 June
 Ferdinand von Lindemann publishes his proof of the transcendentality of pi.
 St Andrew's Ambulance Association is founded in Glasgow, Scotland; St. John Ambulance Canada is also founded this year.
 June 6
 Supposedly, the Bombay Cyclone of 1882 in the Arabian Sea causes flooding in Bombay harbor, leaving about 100,000 dead; this alleged event has, however, been proved a hoax.
 Battle of Embabo: The Shewan forces of Menelik II defeat the Gojjame army.
 June 11 – The 'Urabi revolt breaks out in Egypt against Khedive Tewfik Pasha and European influence in that country.
 June 28 – The Anglo-French Convention of 1882 is signed, marking territorial boundaries between Guinea and Sierra Leone.
 June 30 – U.S. presidential assassin Charles J. Guiteau is hanged in Washington, D.C.

July–September 
 July 11–13 – Anglo-Egyptian War: The British Mediterranean Fleet carries out the Bombardment of Alexandria, its forces capturing the city of Alexandria, Egypt, and securing the Suez Canal.
 July 23 – The Imo Incident occurs in Seoul, Korea, as a result of bad rations and payment towards soldiers of the Joseon Army.
 July 26
 Boers establish the republic of Stellaland in southern Africa.
 Richard Wagner's opera Parsifal debuts, at the Bayreuth Festspielhaus in Bavaria.
 July 31 – The Hebrew Moshava of Rishon LeZion is founded.
 August 3 – The U.S. Congress passes the 1882 Immigration Act.
 August 5 – Standard Oil of New Jersey, the company later known as ExxonMobil, is established.
 August 18 – The Married Women's Property Act 1882 receives royal assent in Britain; it enables women to buy, own and sell property, and to keep their own earnings.
 August 20 – Pyotr Ilyich Tchaikovsky's 1812 Overture debuts in Moscow.
 September 4 – Thomas Edison flips the switch to the first commercial electrical power plant in the United States, lighting one square mile of lower Manhattan. This is considered by many as the day that begins the electrical age.
 September 5 
The first United States Labor Day parade is held in New York City.
Tottenham Hotspur F.C. is founded (as Hotspur F.C.) in London.
 September 13
Anglo-Egyptian War: British troops occupy Cairo, and Egypt becomes a British protectorate.
Selwyn College, Cambridge, is founded after Queen Victoria grants a Charter of Incorporation. 

 September 18 – Great Comet of 1882: Her Majesty's Astronomer at the Cape, David Gill, reports watching the comet rise a few minutes before the Sun, describing it as "The nucleus was then undoubtedly single, and certainly rather under than over 4″ in diameter; in fact, as I have described it, it resembled very much a star of the 1st magnitude seen by daylight."

October–December 
 October 5 – The Society for Ethical Culture of Chicago (the modern-day Ethical Humanist Society of Chicago) is founded by Felix Adler.
 October 14 – The University of the Punjab at Lahore (Undivided India), is founded in modern-day Pakistan.
 October 16 – The New York, Chicago and St. Louis Railroad ("Nickel Plate Road") runs its first trains over the entire system between Buffalo, New York, and Chicago. Nine days later the Seney Syndicate sells the road to William Henry Vanderbilt, for US$7.2 million.
 October 21 – Waseda University is founded by Shigenobu Ōkuma in Japan as Tokyo Specializing School.
 November 2 – The Great Fire of Oulu destroys 27 buildings in the downtown of Oulu, Finland.
 November 14 – Franklyn Leslie shoots Billy Claiborne dead in the streets of Tombstone, Arizona.
 November 16 – The British Royal Navy's  destroys Abari village in Niger.
 December – Zikhron Ya'akov is founded in northern Israel.
 December 6 – A transit of Venus, the last until 2004, occurs.

Date unknown 
 The first International Polar Year, an international scientific program, begins.
 Zulu king Cetshwayo kaMpande returns to South Africa from England.
 A peace treaty is signed between Paraguay and Uruguay.
 Pogroms in Southern Russia end.
 Nikola Tesla claims this is when he conceives the rotating magnetic field principle, which he later uses to invent his induction motor.
 The British Chartered Institute of Patent Agents (the modern-day Chartered Institute of Patent Attorneys) is founded.
 Redruth Mining School opens in Cornwall.
 The Personal Liberty League is established to oppose the temperance movement in the United States.
 Carolyn Merrick is elected president of the Woman's Christian Temperance Union in the United States.
 Founding of the following sports clubs:
 Albion Rovers F.C. (through the amalgamation of two Coatbridge clubs, Albion and Rovers) in the urban west of Scotland;
 Christchurch Rangers, the earliest predecessor of Queens Park Rangers F.C., in London;
 Glentoran F.C. in Belfast in the north of Ireland;
 Thames Ditton Lawn Tennis Club, the oldest lawn tennis club still on its original site, in the outer London suburbs;
 Waterloo F.C., a rugby union club, as Serpentine on Merseyside in the north of England.

Births

January 

 January 5 – Edwin Barclay, 18th president of Liberia (d. 1955)
 January 6
 Fan Noli, Albanian poet, political figure (d. 1965)
 Ferdinand Pecora, Sicilian-born American lawyer (d. 1971)
 Sam Rayburn, Speaker of the United States House of Representatives (d. 1961)
 January 17
 Arnold Rothstein, American gangster (d. 1928)
 Noah Beery, American actor (d. 1946)
 January 18 – A. A. Milne, British author (d. 1956)
 January 20 – Johnny Torrio, Italian-born American gangster (d. 1957)
 January 22 – Theodore Kosloff, Russian-born actor (d. 1956)
 January 23 – Anna Abrikosova, Soviet Roman Catholic religious sister and servant of God (d. 1936)
 January 25 – Virginia Woolf, English writer (d. 1941)
 January 28
 Mary Boland, American actress (d. 1965)
 Gengo Hyakutake, Japanese admiral (d. 1976)
 Pascual Orozco, Mexican revolutionary (d. 1915)
 January 30 – Franklin D. Roosevelt, 32nd President of the United States (d. 1945)
 January 31 – Fritz Leiber, American stage, screen actor (d. 1949)

February 

 February 1 – Louis St. Laurent, 12th Prime Minister of Canada (d. 1973)
 February 2
 Anne Bauchens, American film editor (d. 1967)
 James Joyce, Irish author (d. 1941)
 February 4 – E. J. Pratt, Canadian poet (d. 1964)
 February 5 – Louis Wagner, French Grand Prix racer, aviator (d. 1960)
 February 11 
 Valli Valli, German-born British actress (d. 1927)
 Joe Jordan, American ragtime composer (d. 1971)
 February 12 – Walter Nash, 27th Prime Minister of New Zealand (d. 1968)
 February 15 – John Barrymore, American actor (d. 1942)
 February 18 – Petre Dumitrescu, Romanian general (d. 1950)
 February 22 – Eric Gill, English sculptor, writer (d. 1940)
 February 26 – Husband E. Kimmel, American admiral (d. 1968)
 February 28
 Geraldine Farrar, American soprano (d. 1967)
 Herbert Silberer, Austrian psychoanalyst (d. 1923)

March 

 March 3 – Charles Ponzi, Italian-born American con man (d. 1949)
 March 6 – F. Burrall Hoffman, American architect (d. 1980)
 March 8 – Alfred A. Cunningham, first United States Marine Corps aviator (d. 1939)
 March 12 – Carlos Blanco Galindo, 32nd President of Bolivia (d. 1943)
 March 14
 Wacław Sierpiński, Polish mathematician (d. 1969)
 Giuseppe Tellera, Italian general (d. 1941)
 March 15 – Jim Lightbody, American middle-distance runner (d. 1953)
 March 18 – Gian Francesco Malipiero, Italian composer (d. 1973)
 March 20 – René Coty, 17th President of France (d. 1962)
 March 22 – John W. Wilcox Jr., American admiral (d. 1942) 
 March 23 – Emmy Noether, German mathematician (d. 1935)
 March 24 – George Monckton-Arundell, 8th Viscount Galway, English politician, 5th Governor-General of New Zealand (d. 1943)
 March 30 – Melanie Klein, Austrian-born British child psychoanalyst (d. 1960)

April 

 April 7 – Kurt von Schleicher, Chancellor of Germany (d. 1934)
 April 17 – Artur Schnabel, Polish pianist (d. 1951)
 April 18
 Monteiro Lobato, Brazilian writer (d. 1948)
 Leopold Stokowski, English conductor (d. 1977)
 April 19 – Getúlio Vargas, 14th and 17th president of Brazil (d. 1954)
 April 20
 Nicolae Ciupercă, Romanian general and politician (d. 1950)
 Holland Smith, American general (d. 1967)
 April 21 – Percy Williams Bridgman, American physicist, Nobel Prize laureate (d. 1961)
 April 24 – Hugh Dowding, commander of the RAF Fighter Command during the Battle of Britain (d. 1970)
 April 29 – Hendrik Nicolaas Werkman, Dutch artist, printer (d. 1945)

May 

 May 2 – James F. Byrnes, American politician, Secretary of State and Associate Justice of the Supreme Court of the United States (d. 1972)
 May 5
 Sylvia Pankhurst, English suffragette (d. 1960)
 Sir Douglas Mawson, Australian Antarctic explorer (d. 1958)
 May 6 – Crown Prince Wilhelm of Germany, heir-apparent of Emperor Wilhelm II (d. 1951)
 May 9 – Henry J. Kaiser, American industrialist (d. 1967)
 May 10 – Thurston Hall, American stage & screen actor (d. 1958)
 May 13 – Georges Braque, French painter (d. 1963)
 May 16 – Mary Gordon, Scottish stage and screen actress (d. 1963)
 May 20 – Sigrid Undset, Norwegian author, Nobel Prize laureate (d. 1949)
 May 25 – Marie Doro, American stage, silent film actress (d. 1956)
 May 26 – Jess McMahon, American professional boxing, wrestling promoter (d. 1954)
 May 28 – Avery Hopwood, American playwright (d. 1928)
 May 30 – Wyndham Halswelle, British runner (d. 1915)

June 

 June 4 – Karl Valentin, German actor (d. 1948)
 June 9 – Robert Kerr, Canadian sprinter (d. 1963)
 June 10 – Nevile Henderson, British diplomat (d. 1942)
 June 12 – Roi Cooper Megrue, American playwright (d. 1927)
 June 15 – Ion Antonescu, Romanian prime minister, dictator (d. 1946)
 June 16 – Mohammad Mosaddegh, Iranian politician, 35th Prime Minister of Iran (d. 1967)
 June 17
 Adolphus Frederick VI, Grand Duke of Mecklenburg-Strelitz (d. 1918)
 Igor Stravinsky, Russian composer (d. 1971)
 June 18 – Georgi Dimitrov, 32nd Prime Minister of Bulgaria (d. 1949)
 June 21 – Lluís Companys, President of Catalonia (d. 1940)
 June 28 – Valeska Suratt, American stage actress, silent film star (d. 1962)
 June 29 – Ole Singstad, Norwegian-American civil engineer (d. 1969)

July 
 July 1 – Bidhan Chandra Roy, Indian physician and politician, Chief Minister of West Bengal (d. 1962)
 July 8 – Percy Grainger, Australian composer (d. 1961)
 July 10 – Ima Hogg, American society leader, philanthropist, patron and collector of the arts (d. 1975)
 July 17 – James Somerville, British admiral (d. 1949)
 July 22 – Edward Hopper, American painter (d. 1967)
 July 25 – George S. Rentz, United States Navy Chaplain, Navy Cross winner (d. 1942)
 July 27
 Donald Crisp, English actor, film director, screenwriter, and producer (d. 1974)
 Geoffrey de Havilland, British aviation pioneer, aircraft company founder (d. 1965)
 July 31 
 Itamar Ben-Avi, first native speaker of Modern Hebrew (d. 1943)

August 
 August 11 – Rodolfo Graziani, Italian general (d. 1955)
 August 14 – Gisela Richter, English art historian (d. 1972)
 August 16 – Christian Mortensen, Danish supercentenarian, oldest verified male ever at the time of his death (d. 1998)
 August 19 – MacGillivray Milne, United States Navy Captain, 27th Governor of American Samoa (d. 1959)
 August 22 – Raymonde de Laroche, French aviator, first woman to receive an aviators license (d. 1919)
 August 25 – Seán T. O'Kelly, second President of Ireland (d. 1966)
 August 26 – James Franck, German-born physicist, Nobel Prize laureate (d. 1964)

September 

 September 1 – Nicholas H. Heck, American geophysicist, oceanographer, and surveyor (d. 1953)
 September 10 – Károly Huszár, 25th Prime Minister of Hungary (d. 1941)
 September 11 – William T. Bovie, American biophysicist, inventor (d. 1958)
 September 12 – Ion Agârbiceanu, Romanian writer, journalist, politician and priest (d. 1963)
 September 13 – Ramón Grau, Cuban president (d. 1969)
 September 16 – Robert Hichens, RMS Titanic quartermaster, man at the wheel when Titanic hit the iceberg (d. 1940)
 September 22 – Wilhelm Keitel, German field marshal (d. 1946)
 September 29 – Lilias Armstrong, English phonetician (d. 1937)
 September 30 
 George Bancroft, American film actor (d. 1956)
 Hans Geiger, German physicist (d. 1945)

October 

 October 2 – Boris Shaposhnikov, Soviet military leader, Marshal of the Soviet Union (d. 1945)
 October 3 – A. Y. Jackson, Canadian painter (d. 1974)
 October 5 – Robert H. Goddard, American rocket scientist (d. 1945)
 October 6 – Karol Szymanowski, Polish composer (d. 1937)
 October 8 – Harry McClintock, American singer (d. 1957)
 October 14
Zbigniew Dunin-Wasowicz, Polish military leader (d. 1915)
 Éamon de Valera, Taoiseach and third President of Ireland (d. 1975)
 Charlie Parker, English cricketer (d. 1959)
 October 17 – Giulio Gavotti, Italian aviator (d. 1939)
 October 20 – Bela Lugosi, Hungarian-born American actor (d. 1956)
 October 24 – Sybil Thorndike, British stage, film actress (d. 1976)
 October 25 
 Florence Easton, English opera soprano (d. 1955)
 Tony Jackson, American jazz musician (d. 1921)
 October 30
 William Halsey Jr., American admiral (d. 1959)
 Günther von Kluge, German field marshal (d. 1944)

November 

 November 6 – Feng Yuxiang, Chinese warlord and general (d. 1948)
 November 8 – Ethel Clayton, American silent screen star (d. 1966)
 November 11 
 T. F. O'Rahilly, Irish academic (d. 1953)
 King Gustaf VI Adolf of Sweden (d. 1973)
 November 15 – Felix Frankfurter, Associate Justice of the Supreme Court of the United States (d. 1965)
 November 18 
 Jacques Maritain, French Catholic philosopher (d. 1973)
 Frances Gertrude McGill, Canadian forensic pathologist (d. 1959)
 November 21 – Harold Lowe, Welsh 5th Officer of RMS Titanic (d. 1944)
 November 27 – Leonie von Meusebach–Zesch, American dentist (d. 1944)
 November 29 – Henri Fabre, French inventor of the first seaplane, the Fabre Hydravion (d. 1984)

December 

 December 9
Percy C. Mather, English Protestant missionary (d. 1933)
Joaquín Turina, Spanish composer (d. 1949)
 December 11
 Subramania Bharati, Tamil Indian poet (d. 1921)
 Max Born, German physicist, Nobel Prize laureate (d. 1970)
 December 12 – Ioannis Demestichas, Greek admiral (d. 1960)
 December 16
 Jack Hobbs, English cricketer (d. 1963)
 Zoltán Kodály, Hungarian composer (d. 1967)
 Walther Meissner, German technical physicist (d. 1974)
 December 18 – Richard Maury, American naturalized Argentine engineer (d. 1950)
 December 23 – Mokichi Okada, Japanese religious leader (d. 1955)
 December 28 – Arthur Eddington, English astronomer, astrophysicist and mathematician (d. 1944)
 December 29 – Raymond Stanton Patton, American admiral, engineer and second Director of the United States Coast and Geodetic Survey (d. 1937)

Date unknown 
 Sediqeh Dowlatabadi, Persian feminist, women's rights activist and journalist (d. 1961)
 T. Sathasiva Iyer, Ceylon Tamil scholar, Tamil language writer (d. 1950)

Deaths

January–June 

 

 January 6 – Richard Henry Dana Jr., founder of Dana Point, California (b. 1815)
 January 7 – Ignacy Łukasiewicz, Polish pharmacist, inventor of the first method of distilling kerosene from seep oil, creator of the first oil lamp (b. 1822)
 January 10 – Henri Jules Bataille, French general (b. 1816)
 January 11 – Theodor Schwann, German physiologist (b. 1810)
 January 13 – Juraj Dobrila, Croatian bishop (b. 1812)
 January 27 – Robert Christison, Scottish toxicologist, physician (b. 1797)
 February 5 – Elizabeth Louisa Foster Mather, American writer (b. 1815)
 March 9 – Giovanni Lanza, Italian politician (b. 1810)
 March 19 – Carl Robert Jakobson, Estonian writer, politician, and teacher (b. 1841)
 March 21 – Constantin Bosianu, 4th Prime Minister of Romania (b. 1815)
 March 23 – Gustavus H. Scott, American admiral (b. 1812)
 March 24 – Henry Wadsworth Longfellow, American author (b. 1807)
 April 3 – Jesse James, American Western outlaw (b. 1847)
 April 9 – Dante Gabriel Rossetti, English poet, painter (b. 1828)
 April 11 – John Lenthall, American naval architect, shipbuilder (b. 1807)
 April 14 – Henri Giffard, French balloonist, aviation pioneer (b. 1825)
 April 17
 George Jennings, English sanitary engineer (b. 1801)
 Antonio Fontanesi, Italian painter (b. 1818)
 April 19 – Charles Darwin, British naturalist (b. 1809)
 April 25 – Johann Karl Friedrich Zöllner, German astrophysicist (b. 1834)
 April 27 – Ralph Waldo Emerson, American philosopher, writer (b. 1803)
 May 3 – Leonidas Smolents, Austrian–Greek general and army minister (b. 1806)
 May 5 – John Rodgers, American admiral (b. 1812)
 June 2 – Giuseppe Garibaldi, Italian patriot (b. 1807)
 June 3 – Christian Wilberg, German painter (b. 1839)
 June 22 – Pablo Buitrago y Benavente, First democratically elected Supreme Director of Nicaragua (b. 1807)
 June 25 – François Jouffroy, French sculptor (b. 1806)
 June 30 
Alberto Henschel, German-Brazilian photographer, businessman (b. 1827)
Charles J. Guiteau, American preacher, writer, lawyer, assassin of James A. Garfield (executed) (b. 1841)

July–December 

 July 4 – Joseph Brackett, American Shaker religious leader, composer (b. 1797)
 July 7 – Mikhail Skobelev, Russian general (b. 1843)
 July 13 – Johnny Ringo, American cowboy (b. 1850)
 July 16 – Mary Todd Lincoln, First Lady of the United States (b. 1818)
 July 19 – John William Bean, English criminal (b. 1824)
 July 20 – Fanny Parnell, Irish poet, founder of the Ladies' Land League (b. 1848)
 August 4 – Samuel Barron Stephens, American attorney and politician (b. 1814)
 August 13 – William Stanley Jevons, English economist and logician (b. 1835)
 August 16 – Auguste-Alexandre Ducrot, French general (b. 1817)
 August 25 – Friedrich Reinhold Kreutzwald, Estonian writer, physician (b. 1803)
 August 31 – Pedro Luiz Napoleão Chernoviz, Brazilian physician, writer and publisher (b. 1812)
 September 8 – Joseph Liouville, French mathematician (b. 1809)
 September 14 – Georges Leclanché, French electrical engineer and inventor (b. 1839)
 September 16 – Edward Bouverie Pusey, British churchman (b. 1800)
 September 23 – Friedrich Wöhler, German chemist (b. 1800)
 September 30 – José Milla y Vidaurre, Guatemalan writer (b. 1822)
 October 13 – Arthur de Gobineau, French writer, demographist (b. 1816)
 November 7 – Julius Hübner, German painter (b. 1806)
 November 14 – Billy Claiborne, American gunfighter (b. 1860)
 November 20 – Henry Draper, American astronomer (b. 1837)
 December 3 – Archibald Campbell Tait, Archbishop of Canterbury (b. 1811)
 December 6
 Alfred Escher, Swiss politician, railroad entrepreneur (b. 1819)
 Louis Blanc, French politician, historian (b. 1811)
 Anthony Trollope, British novelist, postal service official (b. 1815)
December 9 – Lucy Smith Millikin, early Latter Day Saint and sister of Joseph Smith (b. 1821)
December 10 – Alexander Gardner, Scottish photographer (b. 1821)
 December 18 – Henry James Sr., American theologian (b. 1811)
 December 21 – Francesco Hayez, Italian painter (b. 1791)
 December 31 – Léon Gambetta, French statesman (b. 1838)

Date unknown
 Eugénie Luce, French educator (b. 1804)

References